The Rangitata Gorge is a gorge located in the Canterbury High Country in the South Island of New Zealand. The narrow gorge links the headwaters of the Rangitata River with the fertile Canterbury Plains. The Rangitata gorge is commercially rafted by a local company. It is also a popular river for visiting kayakers, fishermen and adventurist locals in jet boats. The gorge is a class IV to V+ depending on the flow of the river and home to the notable rapids including Rooster's Tail, Pencil Sharpener, The Pinch, Pigs Trough and Hells Gate.

Rangitata Diversion Race 

The Rangitata Diversion Race takes water from Klondyke at the bottom of the gorge. Construction of the race began in 1937 and completed in 1944. Today the race is 67 kilometers long and carries a maximum of 30 cubic metres of water per second discharging the remaining water at Highbank into the Rakaia River. The race provides water for various irrigation systems and two power plants at Highbank and Montalto.

Tenehaun Conservation Area 

On the north bank of the gorge is the Tenehaun Conservation Area which has good views of the gorge. Activities include hiking and mountain biking.

Reference List 

Timaru District
Populated places in Canterbury, New Zealand